Perosi is an Italian surname. Notable people with the surname include:

Carlo Perosi (1868–1930), Italian cardinal
Lorenzo Perosi (1872–1956), Italian classical composer
Marziano Perosi (1875–1959), Italian classical organist, choirmaster and composer

Italian-language surnames